Sashastra Seema Bal (SSB) is a border guarding force of India deployed along its borders with Nepal and Bhutan. It is one of the seven Central Armed Police Forces under the administrative control of the Ministry of Home Affairs (MHA).

The force was originally set up under the name Special Service Bureau in 1963 in the aftermath of the Sino-Indian War to strengthen India's border areas against enemy operations.

History
The Sashastra Seema Bal was originally set up under the name Special Service Bureau (abbreviated SSB) on 15 March 1963 (current raising day is 20 December, after the date of presidential assent to the SSB Act, 2007), following the Sino-Indian War of 1962. The primary task of the force was to provide armed support to the foreign intelligence division of Intelligence Bureau, which later became Research and Analysis Wing (after its creation in 1968). The secondary objective was to inculcate feelings of national belonging in the border population and assist them in developing their capabilities for resistance through a continuous process of motivation, training, development, welfare programmes and activities in the then NEFA, North Assam (the northern areas of the Indian state of Assam), North Bengal (the northern areas of the Indian State of West Bengal) and the hills of Uttar Pradesh, Himachal Pradesh and Ladakh. The programme was later extended to Manipur, Tripura, Jammu in 1965; Meghalaya in 1975; Sikkim in 1976; the border areas of Rajasthan and Gujarat in 1989; Manipur, Mizoram and further areas of Rajasthan as well as Gujarat in 1988; South Bengal (the southern areas of West Bengal); Nagaland in 1989; and the Nubra Valley, Rajouri and the Poonch district of Jammu and Kashmir in 1991.

Its primary purpose was to counter an act of aggression by the Chinese People's Liberation Army. The previous thinking had been that, militarily, the Chinese were "superior" to India and in the event of a war, the Chinese might attempt to overwhelm Indian forces. So, in 1963, a unique force was created, which would, in the event of such an attempt by the Chinese to invade and occupy Indian territory, merge with the border population, donning civilian attire, working a parallel administration and carry out the war of India with the help of guerrilla tactics.

In 2001, the SSB was transferred to the Ministry of Home Affairs from R&AW and assigned the duties of manning the Nepal and Bhutan borders. The SSB was renamed the Sashastra Seema Bal, in accordance with its new role, and came under the administrative control of the Ministry of Home Affairs. This was done after the Kargil War with the adoption of the "one border one force concept".

The SSB claims to have presented a "benign face" of the government in border areas and that this was appreciated by the people of those areas.

Pursuant to the recommendations of a group of ministers on reforming the national security system, SSB was declared as a Border Guarding Force and Lead Intelligence Agency (LIA) for Indo-Nepal border (June, 2001) and assigned the task of guarding the 1751 km long Indo-Nepal border along the states of Uttarakhand, (263.7 km with 3 districts), Uttar Pradesh (599.3 km—with 7 districts), Bihar (800.4 km—with 7 districts), West Bengal (105.6 km—with 1 district) and Sikkim (99 km). In March 2004, SSB was assigned the task of guarding the 699 km stretch of Indo-Bhutan border along the states of Sikkim- (32 km), West Bengal (183 km—with 2 districts), Assam (267 km—with 4 districts) and, Arunachal Pradesh (217 km—with 2 districts). Since then SSB was re-christened into Sashastra Seema Bal and reached new heights. SSB is the first border guarding force that has decided to recruit women battalions. It is doing excellent job as Border Guarding Force on Indo-Nepal and Indo-Bhutan Border.

SSB is also engaged in Counter-Insurgency operations in Jammu and Kashmir and Anti-naxal operations in Jharkhand, Bihar and Chhattisgarh. It is also performing internal security duties i.e. Election duties and law and order duties in different parts of India.

SSB celebrated the year 2013 as Golden Jubilee year marking 50 years of its raising. The celebrations have commenced with the Flag-off of a Mount Everest Expedition on 2 April 2013 from Delhi. The team led by Commandant Somit Joshi successfully reached at the peak at about 9:45 a.m. (IST) on 21 May 2013 to commemorate the 50th anniversary.

In 2014, the government of India approved the recruitment of women as combat officers in SSB.

Role

The previous role of the Special Service Bureau was to motivate and mobilise India's border population for national security during times of peace as well as war and to promote a sense of security and brotherhood among the population, in furtherance of national integration. Its present-day role consists of preventing cross-border crime and smuggling as well as other anti-national activities.

In pursuit of achieving this mandated task, the SSB has been conferred with certain powers under the Criminal Procedure Code of 1973, the Arms Act of 1959, the NDPS Act of 1985 and the Passport Act of 1967. The Government of India also contemplates conferring additional powers under the Customs Act of 1962.

These powers are to be exercised within a belt of 15 km in the states of Uttarakhand, Uttar Pradesh, Bihar, West Bengal, Sikkim, Assam and Arunachal Pradesh, running along the Indo-Nepal and Indo-Bhutan borders, as well as in any other area of SSB operation.

Organisation
Prior to 2001, the force was known as the Special Service Bureau (SSB). As per its revised role, the uniform wing worked under the operational command of civilian officers. It was in 1985 that a 15% quota of Area Organisers, for promotion to the rank of Deputy Inspector-General, was given to the Commandants of the uniform wing. The civil wing worked in the Area of Operations (AOPs) along the Indo-Tibet and Indo-Pakistan border. Recruitment in uniform wing would be from among Indian youth of the border area who have undergone advanced training in guerrilla warfare and also selected by the respective operational commander such as by the Divisional Organiser, Area Organiser, Sub-Area Organiser and Circle Organiser.

The Divisional Organiser was equivalent in rank to that of Inspector-General of Police, specifically earmarked for the respective AOPs to which they belonged and were activated by. The repercussions of the closure of the old role have been debated and deliberated in the defence establishments and now the relevance of the old role of SSB has been realised for the security of the border area, as such a role is likely to be revived.

The highest-level headquarters of the force is Force Headquarters (FHQ), also called the Directorate-General of SSB, located in the Indian capital of New Delhi. Force Headquarters (FHQ) is commanded by an officer of the rank of Director-General. The Director-General is assisted by the Additional Director-General. Various Directorates including Operations and Intelligence, Personnel and Training, Administration, Provisioning and Communication, Medical, as well as others, function under the DG. Each Directorate is headed by an IG and assisted by a DIG and other officers.

Frontier Headquarters (FTR HQ) is commanded by an officer of the rank of Inspector-General (IG), who is placed next in the chain of command after the FHQ. FTR HQR, in turn, exercises command and control over the sector HQs.

The SSB Battalion, is commanded by an officer of the rank of Commandant and who is assisted by officers of the rank of Second-in-Command, Deputy Commandant and Assistant Commandant. The battalion is further divided into Companies and Border Out-Post (BOP). There are seven companies in a battalion, each company consisting of three border outposts. The company is commanded by an Assistant Commandants and the BOP is commanded by Sub-Inspectors.Each BOP consisting several Border check points.

Personnel

Ranks 
Present rank structure is as follows:

Combatised wing 
 Gazetted Officers (GOs)

 Non-Gazetted Officers (NGOs)

Recruitment
 Assistant Commandants—Assistant Commandants are appointed (as officers are appointed and personnel below officer are recruited in any government organization) through a Competitive Examination conducted by Union Public Service Commission (UPSC) along with Assistant Commandants(Comn) recruitment conducted by SSB.
Sub Inspectors in GD/TEL/COMN are appointed (as SOs) through a competitive examination conducted by SSC and other special vacancies.
Recruitment of constables and Head constables in different branch are also come every year generally.

Training centres
Both civil and uniformed cadres of SSB are equally trained in various warfare's and other specialised courses such as Guerrilla warfare, Counter-Insurgency, Intelligence, Demolition, Jungle and Snow survival etc. The various training centres within the Force and in the training centres of other organisations/agencies.

List of SSB chiefs 
Before 2001, SSB was one of the four organisations under the Directorate General of Security and was headed by a Director. The Director reported to the Principal Director, DGS, who in his turn, reported to DG (Security). On shifting of SSB to the Ministry of Home Affairs, the post of Principal Director, DGS was shifted alongside as Director General, SSB. The post of Director, SSB got re-designated as Additional DG, SSB. Lists of Directors, Principal Directors and Directors General are given below.

Director, Special Service Bureau

Director General, Sashastra Seema Bal

See also
 Ministry of Home Affairs
 Central Reserve Police Force
 Indo-Tibetan Border Police
 Central Industrial Security Force
 Border Security Force
 Assam Rifles
 National Security Guard
 Border outpost

References

Paramilitary forces of India
 
India–Nepal border
Bhutan–India border
Central Armed Police Forces of India
Border guarding forces of India